Lathyrism is a class of neurological disease of humans.

Lathyrism may also refer to:

Forms of lathyrism
Neurolathyrism, caused by consumption of certain legumes of the genus Lathyrus.
Angiolathyrism, caused by consumption of Lathyrus sativus.
Osteolathyrism, sometimes referred to as odoratism, caused by consumption of Lathyrus odoratus seeds (sweet peas).